Evelyn Hu-DeHart is a Professor of History and a Professor of American Studies at Brown University.

Biography
Hu-DeHart was born in Chongqing, China in 1947. Her family fled to Hong Kong in 1949 and then to the United States in 1959. She received a full scholarship to attend Stanford University in 1965 at the age of 17 and graduated in 1968 with a B.A. in Political Science with Honors, and was recognized with the Dinkelspiel Award. Her encounter with the Civil Rights Movement and Third World activism was particularly influential during those years. After a Fulbright to Brazil, she proceeded to receive her Ph.D. at the University of Texas at Austin in 1976 in Latin American History.

She then joined the Department of History at the Washington University in St. Louis, where she stayed from 1973 to 1985, initially as an Instructor and was promoted to an Associate Professor with tenure. She then moved to the Graduate Center at the City University of New York, where she taught until 1988. After which, she served as the first Director of the Center for Studies of Ethnicity and Race in America (CSERA) at the University of Colorado at Boulder. She then became a Professor of History and Ethnic Studies at Brown University, as well as the Director of the school's Center for the Study of Race and Ethnicity in America in 2002.

Additionally, she received a Doctor of Laws honoris causa from the University of Notre Dame in 2003. She has lectured and held visiting appointments in Mexico, Peru, Cuba, France, Hong Kong, Taiwan, and China, as well as at Wesleyan University, New York University, and the University of Michigan, Ann Arbor. She speaks and/or reads over eight languages, including English, Spanish, and Chinese.

Academic work
Hu-DeHart has authored three books, served as editor for four edited volumes, and penned dozens of articles and chapters. She began her career with two books on the Yaqui people of northwest Mexico and its borderlands. After which, her attention turned towards the lost history of Asian migration in Latin America, focusing in particular to their histories in Cuba, Peru, and Mexico, where she examined the ways these immigrants have contributed to their respective societies and cultures. More broadly, she is a noted theorist of diasporas and transnationalism, as well as multicultural education in the United States.

Selected publications
Missionaries, Miners, and Indians: History of Spanish Contact with the Yaqui Indians of Northwestern New Spain, 1533-1830 (1981) 
Yaqui Resistance and Survival: Struggle for Land and Autonomy, 1821-1910 (1984) 
Across the Pacific: Asian Americans and Globalization (Editor) (1999) 
Voluntary Associations in the Chinese Diaspora (co-edited with Khun Eng Kuah-Pearce) (2006) 
Latino Politics en Ciencia Política: The Search for Latino Identity and Racial Consciousness (co-edited with Tony Affigne and Marion Orr) (2014)

References

External links
Brown University Faculty Page
Chinese Railroad Workers in North America Project at Stanford University

Brown University faculty
1947 births
Living people
21st-century American historians
Stanford University alumni
University of Texas at Austin College of Liberal Arts alumni
University of Michigan faculty
Chinese emigrants to the United States
American women historians
Washington University in St. Louis faculty
Educators from Chongqing
Chinese Civil War refugees
Writers from Chongqing
21st-century American women
Graduate Center, CUNY faculty